Highway 116 (AR 116, Ark. 116, and Hwy. 116) is a designation for two east–west state highways in Logan County. A northern route of  runs east from Highway 23 encircling the northeastern quadrant of Booneville and ending at Highway 10. A second route of  begins at Highway 23 and runs east to the Booneville Human Development Center.

Route description

Booneville
Highway 116 begins at Highway 23 north of Booneville near Lake Booneville. The route runs east before turning south and terminating at Highway 10. The average daily traffic counts from the Arkansas State Highway and Transportation Department (AHTD) for 2010 show that about 600 vehicles per day (VPD) use Highway 116.

Booneville Human Development Center
Highway 116 begins at Highway 23 south of Booneville. The route winds southeast to the former Arkansas Tuberculosis Sanatorium Historic District, which was listed on the National Register of Historic Places in 2006. Today the property is the Booneville Human Development Center managed by the Arkansas Department of Human Services. Traffic counts from the AHTD in 2010 indicate that the average daily traffic volume on this segment of Highway 116 is 1128 vehicles per day.

Major intersections

|-
| align=center colspan=5 | Highway 116 begins south of Booneville
|-

See also

References

External links

116
Transportation in Logan County, Arkansas